Georgia Taylor-Brown  (born 15 March 1994) is a British triathlete. Having won bronze in the 2018 and 2019 World Triathlon Series, Taylor Brown won the one-off sprint triathlon race in Hamburg that constituted the 2020 World Triathlon Championship, becoming the fifth British woman to become world champion.

In 2021, Georgia won the silver medal in the 2020 Olympic triathlon, the best result achieved to date by a female triathlete for Great Britain, before winning the gold medal for Great Britain with Jess Learmonth, Jonathan Brownlee and Alex Yee in the Triathlon Mixed Relay on Saturday 31 July 2021. Taylor-Brown also won the 2021 and 2022 Super League Triathlon Championship Series, finishing ahead of Triathlon Mixed Relay Teammate Jess Learmonth. She finished 2nd in all four of the Championship Series races. In 2022, Taylor-Brown won gold in the revived World Triathlon Sprint Championships in Montréal, her second individual global title, and anchored her team to silver in the following day's mixed relay, confirming Great Britain's first quota places at the 2024 Summer Olympics.

Taylor-Brown finished 3rd in the inaugural Esport Triathlon World Championship, held as part of the 2022 Arena Games Triathlon season.

She is Great Britain's most successful female Olympic triathlete, and along with Alex Yee, the most successful Olympic triathlete at a single Games. Georgia Taylor-Brown is based in Leeds, England where she trains at the Leeds Triathlon Centre. She was born in Manchester, England.

Career 
She is a two-time ETU European Junior Champion. Taylor-Brown won the World Junior Championship Silver medal in 2013 along with golds in European Junior Championships in 2012 and 2013. Before that Taylor-Brown won a World Junior Duathlon title in 2012.

A regular in the Great Britain World Triathlon Series squad in 2018, Taylor-Brown earned her first podium at the top level at ITU World Triathlon Leeds behind teammate Vicky Holland and then took bronze at ITU World Triathlon Montreal  and ITU World Triathlon Edmonton, helping her to third place in the overall 2018 World Triathlon Series rankings in her debut year, a feat she was able to repeat in 2019 after scoring top ten finishes in every race and a hometown win in Leeds.

Taylor-Brown was also part of the British Mixed Relay teams that won gold at the 2019 Accenture World Triathlon Mixed Relay Series Nottingham and silver in the ITU World Triathlon Mixed Relay Series Tokyo.

In July 2021, Taylor-Brown joined Jessica Learmonth and Vicky Holland to represent Team GB in the Women's Triathlon at the delayed 2020 Summer Olympics in Tokyo. In difficult conditions and despite suffering a flat tyre on the last cycle lap, she nonetheless closed the resulting gap on the lead group ahead to win silver. A few days later Georgia won the gold medal in the Triathlon Mixed Relay at the Tokyo 2020 Olympics on Saturday 31 July 2021 She also won the 2021 Super League Triathlon Championship series, having finished 2nd in all four Championship series races.

At the 2022 Super League Triathlon, Arena Games Triathlon series, Taylor-Brown finished 4th in the London event, and 3rd at the series finale in Singapore. This was enough to finish 3rd in the final standings of the inaugural Esport Triathlon World Championship.

At the 2022 Super League Triathlon Championship Series, Taylor-Brown finished 3rd at the first event in London behind Cassandre Beaugrand and Taylor Spivey. She dominated at the second event in Munich however, finishing 30 seconds ahead of her closest rival. She finished 3rd at SLT Malibu, following a crash on the bike, in the first round of the event. A week later she won again, and again by a significant margin, at SLT Toulouse. At the final event of the series, in NEOM, Saudi Arabia, Taylor Brown won by a narrow margin ahead of fellow British triathletes Sophie Coldwell and Beth Potter. Her performance secured her the overall 2022 Season Championship title.

Taylor-Brown was appointed Member of the Order of the British Empire (MBE) in the 2022 New Year Honours for services to triathlon.

Personal life 
Georgia was brought up by an athletic family. Georgia's father, Darryl Taylor, represented Great Britain in the 800m. Her mother Bev swam at national level and ran for Sale Harriers. She has been swimming since she was five. Taylor-Brown started running when she was 12 and was selected to run for her school. She chose to focus on triathlon and had a successful trial with the British Triathlon Olympic Development Squad. Originally from Manchester, she moved to Leeds in 2012 to study for a degree in Sports and Exercise Science at Leeds Beckett University.

Competitions 
The following list of results. Unless indicated otherwise, the competitions are triathlons (Olympic Distance).

 DNF = Did not finish

 DNS = Did not start

 DSQ = Disqualified

 * Held in 2021

References

External links 
Georgia Taylor-Brown at British Triathlon

1994 births
Sportspeople from Manchester
Living people
Alumni of Leeds Beckett University
English female triathletes
British female triathletes
Medalists at the 2020 Summer Olympics
Olympic gold medallists for Great Britain
Olympic silver medallists for Great Britain
Olympic medalists in triathlon
Triathletes at the 2020 Summer Olympics
Olympic triathletes of Great Britain
Members of the Order of the British Empire
Triathletes at the 2022 Commonwealth Games
Commonwealth Games medallists in triathlon
Commonwealth Games gold medallists for England
Commonwealth Games silver medallists for England
Medallists at the 2022 Commonwealth Games